Catherine Dawson (née White) is a British former 800 metres runner. Representing Wales, she finished fourth in the 800m final at the 1994 Commonwealth Games, in a career-best time of 2:03.17. She also twice won the Welsh 800m title (1993–94).

International competitions

References

Living people
Athletes (track and field) at the 1994 Commonwealth Games
British female middle-distance runners
Welsh female middle-distance runners
Year of birth missing (living people)
Commonwealth Games competitors for Wales